Aris Vatimbella (3 February 1916 – 20 January 1990) was a Greek alpine skier. He competed in three events at the 1956 Winter Olympics.

References

1916 births
1990 deaths
Greek male alpine skiers
Olympic alpine skiers of Greece
Alpine skiers at the 1956 Winter Olympics
Place of birth missing